An Election to the Edinburgh Corporation was held on 6 May 1969, alongside municipal elections across Scotland. Of the councils 69 seats, 23 were up for election.

Following the election, with two by-elections pending, Edinburgh Corporation was composed of 29 Progressives, 17 Labour councillors, 10 SNP councillors, 7 Conservatives, 2 Liberals, and 2 independents. The Conservatives in particular did well, gaining 4 councillors. Two of these gains were at the expense of Labour, in mainly working class wards. The SNP, in contrast, who had done so well at the previous election, only gained Sighthill.

Following the election, the Progressives and Conservative coalition retained controlled of the council with a majority of 2. There was some friction between the two sides however, with the Conservatives unseating Mr Robert McLaughlin, the former leader of the Progressive group and the deputy chairman of the council for 7 years, in the St. Andrews ward. The Conservatives also gained Colinton, the seat of the retiring Lord Provost Brechin. The seat was not contested by the Progressives. Most Progressive losses, with the exception of St. Andrews ward, were caused by incumbent Progressives stepping down and being replaced with new Conservative councillors. In Merchiston however the Conservative candidate was defeated, with the Liberals instead gaining the seat, meaning that the Liberals controlled 2 out of the 3 Merchiston ward seats.

Turnout was 114,582.

Aggregate results

Ward Results

References

1969
1969 Scottish local elections